Downiehills is a settlement in Aberdeenshire, Scotland, located about three miles west of Peterhead.

References

Villages in Aberdeenshire